Morphology, from the Greek and meaning "study of shape", may refer to:

Disciplines
Morphology (archaeology), study of the shapes or forms of artifacts
Morphology (astronomy), study of the shape of astronomical objects such as nebulae, galaxies, or other extended objects
Morphology (biology), the study of the form or shape of an organism or part thereof
Morphology (folkloristics), the structure of narratives such as folk tales
Morphology (linguistics), the study of the structure and content of word forms
Mathematical morphology, a theoretical model based on lattice theory, used for digital image processing
River morphology, the field of science dealing with changes of river platform
Urban morphology, study of the form, structure, formation and transformation of human settlements
Geomorphology, the study of landforms
Morphology (architecture and engineering), research which is based on theories of two-dimensional and three-dimensional symmetries, and then uses these geometries for planning buildings and structures
 In chemistry and materials science, the study of allotropes, isomers, or material polymorphs

Other
Journal of Morphology, peer-reviewed scientific journal of anatomy and morphology 
Morphology (journal), peer-reviewed academic journal in linguistic morphology
Morphology, 1994 album by Finnish band Neuroactive

See also
Morphological analysis (disambiguation)